Acleris nishidai is a species of moth of the family Tortricidae. It is found at altitudes ranging from 2,300 to 3,100 meters in the mountains of central Costa Rica.

The length of the forewings is 6.2–7.8 mm. The ground colour of the forewings varies from uniform pale rust-brown to somewhat two-toned with a red-brown costal region and a yellow-gold dorsum variegated with red-brown. The costal region may also be grey to beige and with an orange dorsum with irregular blotches of red-brown.

The larvae feed on Rubus eriocarpus, Rubus vulcanicola and Rubus praecipuus. They fold, roll and tie young leaves of their host plants, feeding on them and surrounding leaves. They hide within or adjacent to the folded or rolled leaves. The larvae have a green body and pale carmel head. They reach a length of 7–8 mm.

Etymology
The species is named for entomologist Kenji Nishida.

References

Moths described in 2008
nishidai
Moths of Central America